Forty Licks is a double compilation album by the Rolling Stones. A 40-year career-spanning retrospective, Forty Licks is notable for being the first retrospective to combine their formative Decca/London era of the 1960s, now licensed by ABKCO Records (on disc one), with their self-owned post-1970 material, distributed at the time by Virgin/EMI but now distributed by ABKCO's own distributor Universal Music Group (on mostly disc two). Four new songs are included on the second disc. The album was a commercial success, as it reached No. 2 on both UK and US charts. Concurrently with the album's release, the Stones embarked on the successful, year-long international Licks Tour, which would result in the subsequent Live Licks album being released in 2004.

Background

In 1970, the Rolling Stones had an acrimonious break-up with their former manager, Allen Klein, and their former record label, Decca Records (who licensed their recordings to London Records for release in the US). Because of the terms of their former contract, all of their pre-1970 recordings were all under Klein's control, up to and including Let It Bleed, some tracks that made it on Sticky Fingers and Exile on Main Street, as well as outtakes, unreleased recordings, and live recordings. The Stones would immediately form Rolling Stones Records as a result, that gave them control over all of their subsequent recordings. As a result, any career retrospectives tended to be divided into two eras: prior to the split, and after the split.  Klein's ABKCO Records and Decca Records would continue to release unauthorized greatest-hits records, outtakes and rarities records, and other compilations throughout the 1970s, 1980s, and 1990s.  Any compilations or retrospectives released by the Rolling Stones after 1970, by any of their distributors or partners (such as Atlantic Records or Virgin Records) were always restricted to material recorded and released from 1971 onward. Because of various business deals and mergers of various record companies over time, the barriers to creating a unified retrospective compilation album had been resolved by the early 2000s.

Critical reception
Forty Licks has received mostly positive reviews from music critics. AllMusic's Stephen Thomas Erlewine felt that Forty Licks was similar to ELV1S: 30 #1 Hits because both were influenced by The Beatles' 1, but that Forty Licks had a better concept than ELV1S. Although Rob Brunner's review of the album for Entertainment Weekly was favorable, he felt that the album was not needed because most of the band's fans already own all of the notable songs on the album. Darryl Sterdan of Jam! CANOE also felt that most fans already owned most of the songs on the album and that "Losing My Touch" was the only good previously unreleased song on the collection. Rob Sheffield of Rolling Stone felt that there were several songs missing from the album, but that the compilation was exciting and the four new songs were much better than their other recent work. Stylus magazine's Colin McElligatt felt that the band needed an "all-inclusive" collection, but the collection will not please everyone.

Track listing

Personnel
The Rolling Stones
Mick Jagger – lead vocals, harmonica, percussion, guitar, electric piano
Brian Jones – guitars (lead, slide and rhythm), mellotron, tambura, marimba, harmonica, backing vocals, recorder, piano, sitar (on all disc one tracks except "Gimme Shelter", "You Can't Always Get What You Want", "Wild Horses" and "Honky Tonk Women")
Keith Richards – guitars (lead, slide, rhythm, acoustic and bass), backing vocals, piano, bowed double bass, lead vocals on "Happy" and "Losing My Touch"
Mick Taylor – guitars (lead, slide, rhythm and bass) (on "Wild Horses", "Honky Tonk Women", "Brown Sugar", "Angie", "Tumbling Dice", and "It's Only Rock 'n Roll (But I Like It)")
Charlie Watts – drums, percussion (except on "You Can't Always Get What You Want" and "Happy"), backing vocals
Ronnie Wood – guitars (lead, slide, rhythm, acoustic, and pedal steel), backing vocals, bass drum, bass guitar (on all disc two tracks except "Brown Sugar", "Happy", "Angie", "Fool to Cry" and "Tumbling Dice")
Bill Wyman – bass guitar, organ, maracas, bowed double bass, backing vocals (except on "Street Fighting Man", "Let's Spend the Night Together", "Don't Stop", "Happy", "You Got Me Rocking", "Shattered", "Love Is Strong", "Keys to Your Love", "Anybody Seen My Baby?", "Stealing My Heart", "Tumbling Dice" and "Losing My Touch")

Additional musicians

Bud Beadle – saxophone on "Honky Tonk Women"
Madeline Bell – backing vocals on "You Can't Always Get What You Want"
Sugar Blue – harmonica on "Miss You"
Paul Buckmaster – string arrangements on "Happy"
Blondie Chaplin – backing vocals, shaker and tambourine on "Anybody Seen My Baby?", "Don't Stop", "Keys to Your Love", "Stealing My Heart" and "Losing My Touch"
Moustapha Cisse – percussion on "Undercover of the Night"
Merry Clayton – vocals on "Gimme Shelter"
Mel Collins – saxophone on "Miss You"
Brahms Coundoul – percussion on "Undercover of the Night"
Sarah Dash – backing vocals on "Mixed Emotions"
Jim Dickinson – piano on "Wild Horses"
Rocky Dijon – percussion and congas on "You Can't Always Get What You Want" and "Sympathy for the Devil"
Martin Ditcham – percussion on "Undercover of the Night"
Sly Dunbar – percussion on "Undercover of the Night"
Marianne Faithfull – backing vocals on "Sympathy for the Devil"
Venetta Fields – backing vocals on "Tumbling Dice"
Lisa Fischer – backing vocals on "Mixed Emotions"
Bernard Fowler – backing vocals on "Love Is Strong"
Steve Gregory – saxophone on "Honky Tonk Women"
Nicky Harrison – string arrangement on "Angie"
Nicky Hopkins – acoustic piano, electric piano, synthesized strings and backing vocals on "Street Fighting Man", "Gimme Shelter", "Sympathy for the Devil", "She's a Rainbow", "Happy", "Fool to Cry" and "Tumbling Dice"
Kick Horns – brass on "Mixed Emotions"
Luis Jardim – percussion on "Mixed Emotions"
Darryl Jones – bass guitar on "Don't Stop", "You Got Me Rocking", "Love Is Strong", "Keys to Your Love", "Stealing My Heart" and "Losing My Touch"
John Paul Jones – string arrangement on "She's a Rainbow"
Bobby Keys – saxophone, percussion and maracas on "Brown Sugar", "Happy" and "Tumbling Dice"
Clydie King – backing vocals on "Tumbling Dice"
Al Kooper – piano, French horn and organ on "You Can't Always Get What You Want"
Chuck Leavell – piano, organ and keyboards on "Don't Stop" and "Mixed Emotions"
The London Bach Choir – choir on "You Can't Always Get What You Want"
Dave Mason – shenai on "Street Fighting Man"
Ian McLagan – electric piano on "Miss You"
Jimmy Miller – percussion, drums, cowbell and backing vocals on "Gimme Shelter", "Jumpin' Jack Flash", "You Can't Always Get What You Want", "Honky Tonk Women", "Happy" and "Tumbling Dice"
Jamie Muhoberac – bass guitar and keyboards on "Anybody Seen My Baby?"
Ivan Neville – backing vocals on "Love Is Strong"
Nanette Workman – backing vocals on "You Can't Always Get What You Want" and "Honky Tonk Women"
Jack Nitzsche – piano, tambourine, choral arrangements and Nitzsche-Phone on "(I Can't Get No) Satisfaction", "You Can't Always Get What You Want", "Have You Seen Your Mother, Baby, Standing in the Shadow?", "Mother's Little Helper", "Ruby Tuesday" and "Let's Spend the Night Together"
Denis O'Regan – photography
Anita Pallenberg – backing vocals on "Sympathy for the Devil"
Wayne Perkins – guitar on "Fool to Cry"
Jim Price – trumpet and trombone on "Happy" and "Tumbling Dice"
Reparata and the Delrons – backing vocals on "Honky Tonk Women"
Ian Stewart – piano on "Jumpin' Jack Flash", "Honky Tonk Women", "Brown Sugar" and "Emotional Rescue"
Doris Troy – backing vocals on "You Can't Always Get What You Want" and "Honky Tonk Women"
Waddy Wachtel – electric and acoustic guitar on "Anybody Seen My Baby?"
Don Was – keyboards on "Anybody Seen My Baby?"

Charts

Weekly charts

Year-end charts

Singles

Certifications

References

2002 greatest hits albums
Albums produced by Andrew Loog Oldham
Albums produced by Chris Kimsey
Albums produced by Don Was
Albums produced by Jimmy Miller
Albums produced by the Glimmer Twins
The Rolling Stones compilation albums
Virgin Records compilation albums